Tsar Kaloyan Municipality (former name Hlebarovo Municipality) is a small municipality (obshtina) in Razgrad Province, Northeastern Bulgaria, located in the Danubian Plain about 27 km southeast of Danube river. It is named after its administrative centre - the town of Tsar Kaloyan.

The main road E70 crosses the area, connecting the province centre of Razgrad with the city of Ruse and respectively the Danube Bridge with the eastern operating part of Hemus motorway.

Settlements 

Tsar Kaloyan Municipality includes the following 3 places (towns are shown in bold):

Demography 
The following table shows the change of the population during the last four decades.

Religion 
According to the latest Bulgarian census of 2011, the religious composition, among those who answered the optional question on religious identification, was the following:

See also
Provinces of Bulgaria
Municipalities of Bulgaria
List of cities and towns in Bulgaria

References

External links
 Official website 

Municipalities in Razgrad Province